Danny Fütterer (born 28 August 1975) is a German former professional footballer who played as a midfielder. He made his debut on the professional league level in the Bundesliga for Werder Bremen on 7 May 1999 when he started in a game against Eintracht Frankfurt.

Honours
 DFB-Pokal: 1998–99

References

External links
 

1975 births
Living people
Association football midfielders
German footballers
SV Werder Bremen players
SV Werder Bremen II players
VSK Osterholz-Scharmbeck players
Bundesliga players
Footballers from Bremen